Norris Ford Covered Bridge is a historic covered bridge located near Rushville, Indiana in Rushville Township, Rush County, Indiana. It was built in 1916 by Emmett L. Kennedy and his sons Karl and Charles. The bridge has rounded arch portals and does not have the decorative scrollwork and brackets that are signatures of the Kennedy firm, due to them being out of vogue by 1916.

It was listed on the U.S. National Register of Historic Places in 1983, as part of a multiple property submission covering six bridges built by the Kennedy family firm.

References

Truss bridges in the United States
Covered bridges on the National Register of Historic Places in Indiana
Bridges completed in 1916
Bridges in Rush County, Indiana
National Register of Historic Places in Rush County, Indiana
Road bridges on the National Register of Historic Places in Indiana
Wooden bridges in Indiana
Burr Truss bridges in the United States